Glenn Schumann (born March 29, 1990) is an American football coach who is currently the defensive coordinator at the Georgia Bulldogs.

Early life
Schumann was born on March 29, 1990 to Eric Schumann, a former college football coach and player, and Dr. Sherry Schumann, a college athletic director in Valdosta, Georgia. During his childhood, he moved all over the country because of his father's coaching stops at different places. He played both football and basketball at McKinney Boyd High School, where he lettered in both sports. He was part of McKinney Boyd's first ever graduating class.

Coaching career

Alabama
Unlike most collegiate coaches, Schumann did not play college football. Instead, after graduating high school in Texas, Schumann enrolled at Alabama to be a student assistant under legendary coach Nick Saban in 2008. Reflecting on his time as a student assistant, he said that being a student assistant was, “doing anything that was asked of me.” He graduated from Alabama in 2011 with a bachelor's degree in arts and earned a master's in sports management in 2013.

He served as a student assistant from 2008 to 2011, when he graduated. During his time as a student assistant, Alabama won one SEC Championship and one National Championship. After he graduated, he became a graduate assistant under Saban. During his time as an on-field assistant, he worked closely with Saban and defensive coordinator Kirby Smart in installing the defensive gameplan every week.  He worked with the outside linebackers during the early part of his stint and switched to working with the secondary for the latter part of his tenure as graduate assistant.

In 2014, he became the director of football operations. His responsibilities at this position included off-the-field activities, player development, helping student-athletes balance athletics and academics, and organizing recruiting efforts.

Georgia
When Kirby Smart was hired away from Alabama to become the head coach at Georgia, he made Schumann his first coaching hire. Speaking about the relationship between Smart and Schumann at Alabama, Smart said Schumann, “was my right-hand for four or five years over there.” He was hired as the inside linebackers coach there. This hire also made him the youngest on-field coaching assistant in the SEC. When Roquan Smith, an inside linebacker for Providence at the time, asked Alabama players about Schumann, the Alabama players, “were talking about how much of a guru he was,” Smith said. “Then when I met him and was watching film with him, I was like, ‘Wow, this guy is really that.’”

Schumann coached the aforementioned Smith to winning the Butkus Award, which goes to the nation's best linebacker in 2017. Also in 2017, Georgia won their first SEC Championship since 2005 and advanced to the National Championship, only to lose to his former boss, Nick Saban, and Alabama.

Prior to the 2019 season, defensive coordinator Mel Tucker left to become the head coach at Colorado, so Smart promoted Schumann and outside linebackers coach Dan Lanning to co-defensive coordinators. Georgia's defense in 2019 had the best team defense in the nation, allowing only 12.6 points per game and 276 yards per game.  He was part of the Bulldogs' coaching staff that won the National Championship over Alabama in the 2021 season. He won his second championship with Georgia, and sixth overall, when they defeated TCU in the National Championship.

In February 2023, Schumann interviewed for the Philadelphia Eagles' defensive coordinator job . He ultimately decided to remain at Georgia .

Personal life

Schumann and Lauren Schumann were married in the summer of 2015. They had a son in September 2019.

References

External links
 Georgia Bulldogs bio

1990 births
Living people
Alabama Crimson Tide football coaches
Georgia Bulldogs football coaches
University of Alabama alumni
People from McKinney, Texas
People from Valdosta, Georgia
Coaches of American football from Texas